An election to Ceredigion District Council was held in May 1987.  It was preceded by the 1983 election and followed by the 1991 election. On the same day there were elections to the other local authorities and community councils in Wales.

Boundary Changes
There were a number of boundary changes with other wards being renamed.

Results

Aberaeron (one seat)

Aberporth (one seat)

Aberystwyth East (two seats)

Aberystwyth North (two seats)

Aberystwyth South (two seats)

Aberystwyth West (two seats)

Beulah (one seat)

Borth (one seat)

Capel Dewi (one seat)

Cardigan (three seats)
Ivor Radley stood as an Independent in 1983

Ceulanamaesmawr (one seat)

Ciliau Aeron (one seat)
Williams had stood as a Liberal in 1983.

Faenor (one seat)

Lampeter (two seats)

Llanarth (one seat)
Thomas stood as an Independent in 1983.

Llanbadarn Fawr (two seats)

Llandyfriog (one seat)

Llandysiliogogo (one seat)

Llandysul Town (one seat)

Llanfarian (one seat)
Morgan stood as an Independent in 1983

Llanfihangel Ystrad (one seat)

Llangeitho (one seat)

Llangybi (one seat)

Llanrhystud (one seat)

Llansantffraed (one seat)

Llanwenog (one seat)

Lledrod (one seat)
Morgan had stood as an Independent in 1983.

Melindwr (one seat)

New Quay (one seat)

Penbryn (one seat)

Penparc (one seat)

Tirymynach (one seat)

Trefeurig (one seat)

Tregaron (one seat)

Troedyraur (one seat)

Ystwyth one seat)

References

Ceredigion District Council election
Ceredigion County Council elections
20th century in Ceredigion